Jorge González Amo (born 27 January 1945) is a Spanish middle-distance runner. He competed in the men's 1500 metres at the 1968 Summer Olympics.

References

External links
 

1945 births
Living people
Athletes (track and field) at the 1968 Summer Olympics
Spanish male middle-distance runners
Olympic athletes of Spain
Athletes from Madrid
20th-century Spanish people